The 1979–80 snooker season was a series of snooker tournaments played between 9 July 1979 and 17 May 1980. The following table outlines the results for the ranking and the invitational events.


Calendar

Official rankings 

The top 16 of the world rankings.

Notes

References

External links 
 

1979
Season 1980
Season 1979